Šilai is a town in Panevėžys District Municipality, Lithuania. According to the 2011 census, it had population of 252.

References

Towns in Lithuania
Towns in Panevėžys County